Mario Canahuati is a Honduran politician, businessman and a former Honduran ambassador to the United States. He is a former president of the Honduran Council of Private Enterprise (COHEP).

Representing the National Party of Honduras, Canahuati was the vice-presidential candidate of Porfirio Lobo Sosa in the 2005 Honduran general election, which Manuel Zelaya won. He served as Foreign Minister under President Porfirio Lobo Sosa from 2010 to 2011.

Canahuati is of Palestinian and Greek descent. He graduated from the Georgia Institute of Technology with a degree in industrial engineering in 1977.

References

Living people
Foreign Ministers of Honduras
Ambassadors of Honduras to the United States
National Party of Honduras politicians
Government ministers of Honduras
Georgia Tech alumni
Year of birth missing (living people)